The Nakajima Homare (誉, "praise" or, more usually, "honour") was an air-cooled  twin-row 18 cylinder radial Japanese aircraft engine manufactured during World War II.
Producing almost 2,000 horsepower, it was used widely by both the Imperial Japanese Army and the Imperial Japanese Navy. Given the Navy service designation NK9, the "Homare" was also given the company designation NBA, Army experimental designation Ha-45 (ハ45) or, Army long designation Nakajima Army Type 4 1,900 hp Air-Cooled Radial and, (coincidentally) unified designation code of Ha-45.

Design and development
Development of the Homare started in 1940, and certification was completed in 1941. It succeeded Nakajima's previous 14 cylinder Sakae (Ha-25) engine, which had its own forward seven cylinders staggered from the rear seven for efficient cooling.

The design was exceptionally compact, with an external diameter of 118 cm, a mere 3 cm larger than the Sakae. With a bore and stroke of 130 mm x 150 mm, it was classified as a short-stroke engine. It was designed to output around 1800 hp (1340 kW), or 100 hp (75 kW) per cylinder. However, the tight design of the engine made it difficult to maintain quality in manufacturing, and unreliability in the field was a significant problem; actual output of early models at altitude was in the range of 1300 hp (970 kW), far below the designed capability. Later models had improved performance, and it became one of the predominant powerplants of Japanese military aircraft in the latter part of the war. A total of 9089  were produced.

Variants
 Homare 11 - 1,650 hp (1,230 kW), 1,820 hp (1,357 kW), 1,900 hp (1,417 kW)
 Homare 12 - 1,825 hp (1,361 kW)
 Homare 21 - 1,990 hp (1,460 kW)
 Homare 23 - 2,000 hp (1,491 kW)
 Homare 25 - 2,000 hp (1,491 kW)
 Homare 42 - 2,200 hp (1,640 kW)

Applications
Aichi B7A
Kawanishi N1K-J
Mitsubishi A7M
Nakajima C6N
Nakajima G8N
Nakajima J5N
Nakajima Ki-84
Yokosuka D4Y5
Yokosuka P1Y1

Specifications (Ha-45-21)

See also

References

Notes

Bibliography

 Jane's Fighting Aircraft of World War II. London. Studio Editions Ltd, 1998. 
 Gunston, Bill. World Encyclopaedia of Aero Engines. Cambridge, England. Patrick Stephens Limited, 1989. 

Aircraft air-cooled radial piston engines
1940s aircraft piston engines
Nakajima aircraft engines